Amazing Eats is an American food reality television series that premiered on January 11, 2012, on the Travel Channel. The program is hosted by actor and food enthusiast Adam Richman. In each episode, Richman tracks down cuisines of the United States.

Episodes air every Wednesday at 9pm EST in place of Richman's popular series Man v. Food during its mid-season break. The episodes consist primarily of footage from Man v. Food and Man v. Food Nation re-edited by theme instead of city, and with the eating challenge segments omitted.

Premise
In Amazing Eats, Adam Richman travels the United States to visit food establishments for a taste of the specialties they serve up. Every episode starts off with a brief history lesson about the specialty food that is featured.

Opening: "Magnificent mouth-watering foods. You can find it all across our great nation. And I'm on a quest to taste some of the best. This isn't just food. These aren't just meals. These are the incredible edibles that just can't be beat. This is Amazing Eats!"

Episodes

References

External links
 Amazing Eats official website
 Amazing Eats Facebook page
 
 

2012 American television series debuts
2012 American television series endings
English-language television shows
Food travelogue television series
Food reality television series
Travel Channel original programming